The following is a list of Michigan State Historic Sites in Washtenaw County, Michigan. Sites marked with a dagger (†) are also listed on the National Register of Historic Places in Washtenaw County, Michigan.


Current listings

See also
 National Register of Historic Places listings in Washtenaw County, Michigan

Sources
 Historic Sites Online – Washtenaw County. Michigan State Housing Developmental Authority. Accessed January 5, 2011.

References

Washtenaw
 
State Historic Sites
Tourist attractions in Washtenaw County, Michigan
Michigan-related lists